HK Dukla Michalovce is a professional ice hockey team playing in the Slovak Extraliga, the top level of ice hockey in the country. They play in the city of Michalovce, Slovakia at Michalovce Ice Stadium.

History
The club was founded in 1974. In the 2017–18 season won first time title in second league Slovak 1. Liga. Next season they won again. In the Relegation series they played with MsHK Žilina, the 12th team in 2018–19 Slovak Extraliga season. The winner of best-of-seven series played in Extraliga in 2019–20 season. Michalovce won the series 4–3 and played in 2019–20 Slovak Extraliga season, first time in club history.

Honours

Domestic

Slovak Extraliga
  3rd place (1): 2020–21

Slovak 1. Liga
  Winners (2): 2017–18, 2018–19
  Runners-up (2): 2012–13, 2013–14

1st. Slovak National Hockey League
  Winners (1): 1985–86

Players

Current roster

References

External links 
  

Michalovce